Samla macassarana is a species of sea slug, an aeolid nudibranch, a marine heterobranch mollusc in the family Samlidae.

Description
S. macassarana can grow up to a maximum length of 30mm (3 cm) and is translucent with white pigment on the oral tentacles, orange tips to the white cerata and translucent head appendages.

Distribution
This species is distributed in the Western Pacific Ocean and can be commonly found in the Philippines and Malaysia.

References

Samlidae
Gastropods described in 1905